Boulenophrys jinggangensis is a species of frog in the family Megophryidae from the Jinggang Mountains of southern China.

References

jinggangensis
Endemic fauna of China
Amphibians of China
Amphibians described in 2012